Juliano Real Pacheco (born 6 April 1990), simply known as Juliano Pacheco, is a Brazilian footballer who plays for Brasil de Pelotas. Mainly a defensive midfielder, he can also play as a left back.

Club career
Born in Pelotas, Rio Grande do Sul, Juliano graduated with Internacional's youth setup. On 11 December 2011, after making his senior debuts in the year's Campeonato Gaúcho, he was loaned to Goiás for a year.

Juliano made his professional debut on 3 August 2012, coming on as a late substitute for Walter in a 6–0 away routing of Ipatinga for the Série B championship. Despite appearing rarely, he signed permanently with the club in December.

On 15 May 2014 Juliano made his Série A debut, starting in a 2–0 home win against Botafogo.

References

External links
Juliano Pacheco at playmakerstats.com (English version of ogol.com.br)

1990 births
Living people
People from Pelotas
Brazilian footballers
Association football defenders
Association football midfielders
Campeonato Brasileiro Série A players
Campeonato Brasileiro Série B players
Campeonato Brasileiro Série C players
Campeonato Brasileiro Série D players
Sport Club Internacional players
Goiás Esporte Clube players
Fortaleza Esporte Clube players
Figueirense FC players
Clube de Regatas Brasil players
Sociedade Esportiva e Recreativa Caxias do Sul players
Esporte Clube São Bento players
Sportspeople from Rio Grande do Sul